Galvanized is the seventh studio album by The Urge. It was released on November 22, 2013 through their own label, The Urge, LLC. It is the first studio album since 2000's Too Much Stereo and the first album since their disbandment in December 2001.

Overview 
On July 15, 2011, The Urge confirmed that they would be reforming to write new music. Their new single "Say Yeah" debuted immediately following the announcement at Pop's live on the radio. Their first show back together was Pointfest 29. During the live radio interview, the band discussed with Donny Fandango that the new music will be entirely new material, and will not be the abandoned album "Escape From Boys Town" from 2001 (which they currently have no plans of resurrecting).

Release and promotion 
To promote the album, the band performed at The Pageant in St. Louis, MO on November 22, 23 and 29, 2013.

Track listing

Personnel 
The Urge
 Steve Ewing - vocals
 Karl Grable - bass
 Jerry Jost - guitars
 John Pessoni - drums
 Bill Reiter - saxophone, keyboards
 Matt Kwiatkowski - trombone

Charts

References 

2013 albums
The Urge albums